The 26th General Assembly of Nova Scotia represented Nova Scotia between 1874 and 1878.

John B. Dickie was chosen as speaker for the house in 1875. Mather Byles DesBrisay served as speaker from May 1875 to 1876, when he was named county judge. Isaac N. Mack became speaker in 1877.

The assembly was dissolved on September 21, 1878.

List of Members 

Notes:

References 
 

Terms of the General Assembly of Nova Scotia
1874 establishments in Nova Scotia
1878 disestablishments in Nova Scotia
19th century in Nova Scotia